This is a list of Insektors episodes.

Season 1 (1994)

Season 2 (1995)

Specials

Insektors